"The Thundering Wave" was an American television play broadcast on December 12, 1957, as part of the second season of the CBS television series Playhouse 90. John Frankenheimer directed. James Mason, Franchot Tone, and Joan Bennett starred.

Plot
A separated couple are asked to perform together in a play. They disagree as to whether their daughter should be married.

Cast
The following performers received screen credit for their performances:

 James Mason - Sidney Lowe
 Franchot Tone - Allen Grant
 Joan Bennett - Vickie Maxwell
 Pamela Mason - Marcia Lowe
 Susan Oliver - Louise Grant
 Jack Klugman - Lew Downs

Production
John Frankenheimer was the director and Robert Alan Aurthur the writer. It was originally broadcast on December 12, 1957. It was part of the second season of Playhouse 90, an anthology television series that was voted "the greatest television series of all time" in a 1970 poll of television editors.

References

1957 television plays
1957 American television episodes
Playhouse 90 (season 2) episodes